The 1991 World Table Tennis Championships were held in Chiba from April 24 to May 6, 1991.

North Korea and South Korea fielded a unified team under the name Korea (コリア Koria), the first of all Unified Korean sporting teams. The women's Korean team captured the gold medal by topping China, winners of eight consecutive titles since 1975, 3–2 in the final.

Results

Team

Individual

Unified team of Korea 

Prior to the competition, North and South Korea discussed the possibility of the first unified football and table tennis teams since Korea's division. In February 1991, they agreed to the creation of the unified table tennis team to compete at the 1991 World Table Tennis Championships. According to Chang Ung, International Olympic Committee member from North Korea, the decision took 22 rounds of talks between the Koreas and five months.

The team used "Korea" (Korean hangul: , McCune–Reischauer: K'oria, Revised Romanization: Koria, Japanese:  Koria) as the country name avoiding Hanguk or Chosŏn. It also used the Korean Unification Flag as the national flag and Arirang as the national anthem. Upon defeating the supposedly "unbeatable" Chinese team, the women's team caused a big sensation in Korea.

A South Korean movie Korea ("As one") was released on May 3, 2012, and describes the story of the women's team. Hyun Jung-Hwa was portrayed by Ha Ji-won and Li Bun-Hui by Bae Doona.

References

External links
ITTF Museum

 
World Table Tennis Championships
World Table Tennis Championships
World Table Tennis Championships
Table tennis competitions in Japan
Table